Alice Burton Russell (June 30, 1889 – January 1, 1985) was an African-American actress, producer, and the wife of director Oscar Micheaux. She appeared in several films directed by her husband.

Biography 
She was born in 1889 in Maxton, North Carolina. Her parents were M. J. Russell and Robert Russell, who was a prominent newspaper editor, publisher, and politician.

Russell and Micheaux married on March 20, 1926, in Montclair, New Jersey.

She began her acting career in silent film, starring in her husband's The Broken Violin (1928). She continued to act after talkies predominated. She was mentioned often as A. Burton Russell in credits. In the 1930s, she produced three films by her husband and worked as miscellaneous crew in two films.

Living nearly 100 years, she died in New Rochelle, New York. She was buried in an unmarked grave in Greenwood Cemetery in Rye, New York. Her gravesite is now marked with a stone honoring her achievements in the entertainment industry.

Filmography 
As actress:
 The Broken Violin  (1928)
 Wages of Sin (1929)
When Men Betray (1929)
 Easy Street (1930)
A Daughter of the Congo (1930)
Veiled Aristocrats (1932)
Ten Minutes to Live (1932)
The Girl from Chicago (1932)
Harlem After Midnight (1934)
 Murder in Harlem (1935)
 God's Step Children (1938)
Birthright (1939)
 The Betrayal (1948)

As producer:
 Darktown Revue (1931)
 Murder in Harlem (1935)
 Birthright (1939)

As miscellaneous crew:
 Ten Minutes to Live (1932)
 Swing! (1938)

See also 
Oscar Micheaux

References

External links 

Alice B. Russell at the Women Film Pioneers Project
Alice B. Russell Micheaux at Find a Grave

1880s births
1984 deaths
People from Maxton, North Carolina
American silent film actresses
Film producers from New York (state)
Actresses from New Rochelle, New York
20th-century American actresses
American film actresses
African-American actresses
Women film pioneers
American women film producers
African-American film producers
20th-century African-American women
20th-century African-American people